Covert Bailey (b. 1931) is a retired author, television personality, and lecturer on fitness and diet during the 1990s.  His best selling book, Fit or Fat, first published in 1978, emphasized the role of aerobic exercise and weightlifting in promoting weight-loss.  According to WorldCat, the book is held in 1145 libraries  From 1978 to 1999, he authored or co-authored 8 different books on health, diet, and nutrition.  In 1990 Bailey appeared in a PBS series "Fit or Fat for the 90s," produced by KVIE of Sacramento, California.

Biography
Bailey was born in Boston, and briefly attended Bates College in Lewiston, Maine, before dropping out to enlist in the U.S. Army in 1952. After graduating from the Army Language School in Monterey, California, he served in the U.S. Army in Germany during the Cold War.  After his service, he re-entered college and earned a bachelor's and a master's degree from Boston University in geology. In 1967 he enrolled in the master's program in nutritional biochemistry. He began his career as a nutritionist working for the California Dairy Council, giving lectures on diet, and gradually built up his skills as a lecturer.

References 

 

Living people
United States Army soldiers
Boston University College of Arts and Sciences alumni
Bates College alumni
Politicians from Boston
1931 births
American television personalities
American exercise and fitness writers
American exercise instructors
American nutritionists
American expatriates in Germany